Poipet Municipality is a municipality in the west of Banteay Meanchey province in north-western Cambodia.

Administration
The municipality's governor reports to Oung Ouen, the governor of Banteay Meanchey province. Poipet Municipality is subdivided into 2 communes (sangkat), and further subdivided into 26 villages.

References

Districts of Banteay Meanchey province
Cambodia–Thailand border crossings